David Louis Newman (born March 11, 1954) is an American composer and conductor known particularly for his film scores.  In a career spanning more than thirty years, he has composed music for nearly 100 feature films, as well as the 1997 and 1998 versions of the 20th Century Fox fanfare.  He received an Academy Award nomination for writing the score to the 1997 film Anastasia, contributing to the Newmans being the most nominated Academy Award extended family, with a collective 92 nominations in various music categories.

Life and career
Newman was born on March 11, 1954, in Los Angeles, California, the son of Mississippi-born Martha Louis (née Montgomery) and Hollywood composer Alfred Newman. His paternal grandparents were Russian Jewish immigrants. He is the older brother of Thomas Newman, Maria Newman and the cousin of Randy Newman, all of whom are also composers. He is also the nephew of composers Lionel Newman and Emil Newman, and first cousin, once removed, of musician Joey Newman. An accomplished violinist, and successful concert conductor, Newman was educated at the University of Southern California. From late 70s until the early 80s he played violin on most of John Williams' L.A. scoring sessions, and credits him for learning much about film-music composition.

His first film work was on Tim Burton's short film Frankenweenie in 1984.  In 1987, he scored Danny DeVito's Throw Momma from the Train. This was his first collaboration with DeVito, and he went on to score nearly all of his subsequent films, including The War of the Roses (1989), Other People's Money (1991), Hoffa (1992), Matilda (1996) and Death to Smoochy (2002). Newman has also scored the comedies The Flintstones (1994), The Mighty Ducks (1992), The Nutty Professor (1996), Paradise (1991), and Bill & Ted's Excellent Adventure (1989).

Newman's credits during the early years of his career were mostly scoring B-movies such as The Kindred (1987) and The Runestone (1990) before he gradually transitioned to score mostly comedy films during his prime such as Bowfinger (1999), The Freshman (1990), and The Spy Next Door (2010). His score for The Spirit (2008) was a tribute to Mancini's 1950s and 60s neo-noir scores such as Touch of Evil (1958) or Experiment in Terror (1962).

He received an Academy Award nomination for the score to the animated Don Bluth film Anastasia (1997), following his father, who scored the 1956 live-action version.  However, he lost to Anne Dudley for The Full Monty.  His other scores include Critters, The Phantom, The Brave Little Toaster, Malone, Ice Age,  102 Dalmatians and Serenity, among others.

In 1997, Newman began a four-year stint as the music director for the Sundance Institute, and he has conducted the Los Angeles Philharmonic orchestra on several occasions.  That year, he also re-recorded the 20th Century Fox Fanfare that was originally composed by his father Alfred, to coincident with the re-opening of the Newman Scoring Stage at the Fox Studios Lot in LA, which debuted in the aforementioned Anastasia and is still being used permanently, using the 1998 version.

In February 2007, he was elected president of The Film Music Society.

On May 21, 2009, Newman was honored with the Richard Kirk award at the annual BMI Film & Television Awards.  The prestigious award is given annually to a composer who has made significant contributions to film and television music.

Since 2012, Newman has conducted the RSO Vienna orchestra at the annual film music gala concert Hollywood in Vienna which is broadcast on radio and TV.

Newman is an alumnus and Board Member of the American Youth Symphony.

Filmography

Film

1980s

1990s

2000s

2010s

2020s

Television

References

External links

Comprehensive David Newman fansite
David Newman

1954 births
20th-century American Jews
21st-century American Jews
American film score composers
American male film score composers
American people of Russian-Jewish descent
American television composers
Animated film score composers
Jewish American film score composers
Jewish American television composers
Living people
Male television composers
Musicians from Los Angeles
David
USC Thornton School of Music alumni
Blue Sky Studios people
Sony Pictures Animation people
DreamWorks Animation people
Pixar people